"The war to end war" (also "The war to end all wars"; originally from the 1914 book The War That Will End War by H. G. Wells) is a term for the First World War of 1914–1918. Originally an idealistic slogan, it is now mainly used sardonically, since not only was the First World War not history's final war, but its aftermath also indirectly contributed to the outbreak of the even more devastating Second World War.

Origin
During August 1914, immediately after the outbreak of the war, English author and social commentator H. G. Wells published a number of articles in London newspapers that subsequently appeared as a book entitled The War That Will End War. He blamed the Central Powers for starting the war and argued that only the defeat of German militarism could bring about an end. He used the shorter form, "the war to end war", for In the Fourth Year (1918), in which he noted that the phrase "got into circulation" in the second half of 1914. It became one of the most common catchphrases of the First World War.

Later use
During the First World War, the phrase met with some degree of skepticism. As it became apparent that the war had not succeeded in ending war, the phrase took on a more cynical tone. The British staff officer Archibald Wavell, a future field marshal and viceroy of India, said despondently of the Paris Peace Conference, "After the 'war to end war', they seem to have been pretty successful in Paris at making the 'Peace to end Peace'." Wells himself used the phrase in an ironic way in the novel The Bulpington of Blup (1932).<ref>{{cite book |title=The Bulpington of Blup |last=Wells |first=H. G. |year=1932 |isbn= 9781409725664|pages=161, 163, 173 |url=https://books.google.com/books?id=XtPlMpq6YkkC&pg=PA173|access-date=2010-08-24 }}</ref> Walter Lippmann 1967, "The delusion is that whatever war we are fighting is the war to end war", while U.S. President Richard Nixon, in his "Silent Majority" speech (1969), said, "I do not tell you that the war in Vietnam is the war to end wars". The 1976 Eric Bogle song "No Man's Land" ("The Green Fields of France"), addressed to the grave of a 19-year-old soldier in a First World War Cemetery, contains the lyric "Did you really believe that this war would end wars?". 

Since at least the last third of the 20th century, the alternative wording "the war to end all wars" has become more popular. The War to End War was the title of Laurence Stallings's 1959 book on the war. It was also a title of a chapter of the American high school history textbook The American Pageant'' (first published 1956), and remained so up to its 15th edition in 2013. However, "The War to End All Wars" was used by later authors such as Edward M. Coffman (1968), Russell Freedman (2010) and Adam Hochschild (2011).

See also
 Mutual assured destruction
 Peace for our time
 Never again
 Mission Accomplished speech

References

External links
 H. G. Wells, The War That Will End War on the Internet Archive

H. G. Wells
Political catchphrases
World War I